Humorist Robert Benchley (1889–1945) produced over 600 essays, initially compiled in over twelve volumes, during his writing career.  He was also featured in a number of films, including 48 short treatments that he mostly wrote or co-wrote, and numerous feature films.

The following is a list of those compilations and appearances.

Books

Benchley produced twelve compilation books of his work for the various publications he wrote and freelanced for, and numerous posthumous compilations of his work have been produced since his death.  Unless otherwise indicated, all volumes featuring illustrations were drawn by Gluyas Williams.

Collections During His Lifetime

 Of All Things - Henry Holt & Company, 1921.  234p. - 22 essays by Robert Benchley published in Vanity Fair, The New York Tribune, Collier's Weekly, Life, and Motor Print.
 Love Conquers All - Henry Holt & Company, 1922.  310p. - 63 essays published in Life, The New York World, The New York Tribune, The Detroit Athletic Club News, and The Consolidated Press Association.
 Pluck And Luck - Henry Holt & Company, 1925.  295 p. - 50 essays published in Life, The Detroit Athletic Club News, The Bookman, College Humor, and The Theatre Guild Program.
 The Early Worm - Henry Holt & Company, 1927. 263p. - 47 essays published in Life, The Detroit Athletic Club News, The New Yorker, College Humor, and The Bell Syndicate.
 20,000 Leagues under the Sea, or David Copperfield - Henry Holt & Company, 1928.  233p.  - 40 essays by Robert Benchley published in The Bookman, The Detroit Athletic Club News, The Forum, Life, The New Yorker, and The Yale Review.
 The Treasurer's Report & Other Aspects of Community Singing - Harper and Brothers, 1930.
 No Poems, Or Around the World Backwards and Sideways -  Harper and Brothers, 1932.  330p. - 45 essays.
 From Bed to Worse, or Comforting Thoughts about the Bison - Harper and Brothers, 1934.  286p. - 60 essays.
 My Ten Years in a Quandary, and How They Grew - Harper and Brothers, 1936. 361p - 105 essays.
 After 1903 - What? - Harper and Brothers, 1938.
 Inside Benchley - Harper and Brothers, 1942.  316p. - 50 previously published essays.
 Benchley Beside Himself - Harper and Brothers, 1943. 304p. - 47 previously published essays.  Williams illustrations and still photos from Benchley's short films.

Book Prefaces, Introductions,  and Forewords

 Ellison Hoover Cartoons From Life - Simon & Schuster, 1925.
 Justin Stafford Lucien Esty Ask Me Another! The Question Book - Viking Press, 1927.
 Gluyas Williams The Gluyas Williams Book - Doubleday, Doran, 1929.
 Peter Arno Peter Arno's Hullabaloo - Horace Liveright, 1930.
 The Fourth New Yorker Album - Doubleday, Doran, 1931.
 Dwight Fiske (and Dawn Powell) Without Music - The Chatham Press, 1933.
 S. J. Perelman Strictly From Hunger - Random House, 1937.
 Gluyas Williams Fellow Citizens - Doubleday, Doran, 1940.
 Morton Thompson Joe, The Wounded Tennis Player - Doubleday, Doran, 1945.

Posthumous

 Benchley--Or Else - Harper and Brothers, 1947.  273p - 71 essays, six of which were originally published in The New Yorker.
Chips off the Old Benchley - Harper and Brothers, 1949. 360p. - Collection of 77 essays compiled by Gertrude Benchley, Robert's wife.  Many of the illustrations were previously unpublished in book form.
 The "Reel" Benchley -  A. A. Wyn, Inc., 1950. 96p - No Williams illustrations, instead consisting of stills and scripts from many of Benchley's short films.
 The Benchley Roundup - Harper and Brothers, 1954.  288p- A collection of essays, written between 1915 and 1945, edited by Nathaniel Benchley
 Benchley Lost and Found: Thirty-Nine Prodigal Pieces - Dover Publications, 1970. 183p.
 The Benchley Omnibus - University of Chicago Press, 1983. 353p - Edited by Nathaniel Benchley.
 The Best of Robert Benchley -  Avenel Books, 1983.  353p.
 Benchley at the Theatre: Dramatic Criticism, 1920-1940 by Robert Benchley - Ipswich Press, 1985. - Edited by Charles Getchell, the volume contains 84 of Benchley's theatrical reviews written for Life and The New Yorker over his career.
 Robert Benchley's Wayward Press: The Complete Collection of his The New Yorker Columns written as Guy Fawkes (S.L. Harrison, ed.) -  Wolf Den Books, 2008. 341p - Collection of all Wayward Press columns, with a Prologue by Nat Benchley.
 The Athletic Benchley-105 Exercises from The Detroit Athletic Club News  -  Glendower Media, 2010.

Film and television
Benchley filmed for Fox Film Corporation, Universal Pictures, RKO Radio Pictures, and then primarily for Metro-Goldwyn-Mayer and Paramount Pictures. Toward the end of his career, he did freelance acting around Hollywood. The films are listed by release date, not by production date.

Short films
 The Treasurer's Report (1928, Fox Film Corporation) as Treasurer
 The Sex Life of the Polyp (1928, Fox) as Lecturer
 The Spellbinder (1928, Fox) as himself
 Furnace Trouble (1929, Fox) as himself
 Lesson No. 1 (1929, Fox) as Lecturer
 Stewed, Fried, and Boiled (1929, Fox) as Lecturer
 Your Technocracy and Mine (1933, Universal Pictures) as himself
 How to Break 90 at Croquet (1935, RKO Radio Pictures) as Joe Doakes
 How to Sleep (1935, Metro-Goldwyn-Mayer - Written and acted by Benchley, the short was based on a study on sleep and won the Academy Award in 1935 for Best Short Film, Benchley played narrator and sleeper) as Lecturer
 David O. Selznick: 'Your New Producer' (1935, MGM) as Master of Ceremonies
 How to Behave (1936, MGM) as himself
 How to Train a Dog (1936, MGM) as Lecturer / Dog Owner
 How to Vote (1936, MGM) as himself
 How to Be a Detective (1936, MGM) as Lecturer
 The Romance of Digestion (1937, MGM) as Joe Doakes
 How to Start the Day (1937, MGM) as Lecturer
 A Night at the Movies (1937, MGM - Written and acted by Benchley, this short was his most well-received since How to Sleep.  About a man going to the movies, the short was nominated for an Academy Award) as Husband
 How to Figure Income Tax (1938, MGM) as Joe Doakes
 Music Made Simple (1938, MGM) as Robert Benchley
 An Evening Alone (1938, MGM) as Doakes
 How to Raise a Baby (1938, MGM) as Lecturer Father
 The Courtship of the Newt (1938, MGM) as Zoology professor
 How to Read (1938, MGM) as Lecturer
 How to Watch Football (1938, MGM) as Football Fan
 Opening Day (1938, MGM) as City Treasurer Benchley
 Mental Poise (1938, MGM) as Psychoanalyst / Mr. Ostegraf
 How to Sub-Let (1939, MGM) as Joseph A. Doakes
 An Hour for Lunch (1939, MGM) as Lecturer / Joe
 Dark Magic (1939, MGM) as Joseph A. Doakes
 Home Early (1939, MGM) as Joe Doakes
 How to Eat (1939, MGM) as Lecturer / Joe Doakes
 The Day of Rest (1939, MGM) as Joe Doakes
 See Your Doctor (1939, MGM) as Lecturer / Joseph H. Doakes
 That Inferior Feeling (1940, MGM - Also known as That Inferior Feeling) as Joseph H. 'Joe' Doake
 Home Movies (1940, MGM) as Joe Doakes
 The Trouble with Husbands (1940, Paramount Pictures - Written by and starring Benchley) as Joe Doakes
 Waiting for Baby (1941, Paramount - Written by and starring Benchley) as Joseph Doakes
 Crime Control (1941, Paramount -  Written by and starring Benchley) as Sgt. Benchley / Joe Doakes
 The Forgotten Man (1941, Paramount - Written by and starring Benchley) as Joe Doakes
 How To Take a Vacation (1941, Paramount - Written by and starring Benchley) as The Husband
 Nothing But Nerves (1941, Paramount - Written by and starring Benchley) as Mr. Benchley
 The Witness (1941, Paramount - Written by and starring Benchley) as Joe Doakes
 Keeping In Shape (1941, Paramount - Written by and starring Benchley) as Lecturer / Joe Doakes
 The Man's Angle (1942, Paramount - Written by and starring Benchley) as Joe Doakes
 My Tomato (1943, MGM - Starring Benchley) as Joseph A. Doakes
 No News Is Good News (1943, MGM - Written by and starring Benchley) as Answer Man / Newscaster
 Important Business (1944, MGM - Written by and starring Benchley) as Joseph A. Doakes
 Why, Daddy? (1944, MGM - Written by and starring Benchley - his last short film for MGM) as Joseph A. Doakes
 Boogie Woogie (1945, Paramount - Written by and starring Benchley) as Frederick Stumplefinger, Father
 Hollywood Victory Caravan (1945, Paramount and the United States Treasury Department - Starring Benchley, a film version of the touring show) as himself
 I'm a Civilian Here Myself (1945, United States Navy - Written by and starring Benchley) as Joe Doakes

Feature films
 You'd Be Surprised (1926, Paramount - Writer of intertitles for the film)
 The American Venus (1926, Paramount - writer of intertitles for the film) (uncredited)
 Sky Devils (1932, RKO - Featuring Benchley as a writer)
 The Sport Parade (1932, RKO - Written by and starring Benchley) as Radio Announcer
 Secrets of the French Police (1932, RKO - additional dialogue)
 Headline Shooter (1933, RKO - Starring Benchley) as Radio Announcer
 Rafter Romance (1933, RKO - Starring Ginger Rogers and Benchley) as Hubbell
 Dancing Lady (1933, MGM - Written by and starring Benchley) as Ward King
 Social Register (1934, Columbia Pictures - Starring Benchley in a bit part) as himself
 The Gay Divorcee (1934, RKO - Featuring Benchley as a writer; it was nominated for an Academy Award for Best Picture)
 The Gay Bride (1934, MGM - Featuring Benchley as a writer)
 Murder on a Honeymoon (1935, RKO - Featuring Benchley as a writer)
 China Seas (1935, MGM - Starring Benchley) as Charlie McCaleb
 Pursuit (1935, MGM - Featuring Benchley as a writer)
 The Perfect Gentleman (1935, MGM - Featuring Benchley as a writer)
 Dancing Pirate (1936, RKO - Featuring Benchley as a writer)
 Riffraff (1936, MGM - Featuring Benchley as a writer)
 Piccadilly Jim (1936, MGM - Featuring Benchley as a writer and actor; based on the novel of the same name by P. G. Wodehouse) as Bill Macon
 Broadway Melody of 1938 (1937, MGM - Starring Benchley in a bit part) as Duffy
 Live, Love and Learn (1938, MGM -Featuring Benchley as a writer) as Oscar
 Foreign Correspondent (1940, United Artists / Walter Wanger Productions - Directed by Alfred Hitchcock and featuring dialogue written by Benchley. Benchley also acted in the film) as Stebbins
 Hired Wife (1940, Universal - Starring Benchley) as Roger Van Horn
 The Reluctant Dragon (1941) - Walt Disney/RKO - Benchley played himself in the live action portions of this feature, giving a tour of the then-new Walt Disney Studios facility.  Benchley was unhappy with the final product, as the writers relied too much (in his opinion) on pratfalls and visual gags) as himself
 Nice Girl? (1941, A dramatic film, and a straight role for Benchley, often considered his finest straight performance) as Oliver Wendall Holmes Dana
 You'll Never Get Rich (1941, Columbia - Starring Benchley) as Martin Cortland
 Three Girls About Town (1941, Columbia - Starring Benchley) as Wilburforce Puddle
 Bedtime Story (1941, Columbia - Starring Benchley) as Eddie Turner
 Take a Letter, Darling (1942, Paramount - Starring Benchley) as G.B. Atwater
 Syncopation (1942, RKO - Starring Benchley) as Doakes
 The Major and the Minor (1942, Paramount - Starring Benchley in a film directed by Billy Wilder) as Albert Osborne
 I Married a Witch (1942, United Artists - Starring Benchley in a film directed by René Clair) as Dr. Dudley White
 Young and Willing (1943, United Artists - Starring Benchley) as Arthur Kenny
 The Sky's the Limit (1943, RKO - Starring Benchley) as Phil Harriman
 Flesh and Fantasy (1943, Universal - Benchley narrated) as Doakes (Framing Story)
 Song of Russia (1944, MGM - Starring Benchley) as Hank Higgins
 See Here, Private Hargrove (1944, MGM - Starring Benchley) as Mr. Holliday (uncredited)
 Her Primitive Man (1944 - Starring Benchley) as Martin Osborne
 Janie (1944, Warner Bros. - Starring Benchley) as John Van Brunt
 National Barn Dance (1944, Paramount - Starring Benchley, a fictional account of the radio show of the same name) as J.B. Mitcham
 Practically Yours (1944, Paramount - Starring Benchley) as Judge Robert Simpson
 Pan-Americana (1945, RKO - Starring Benchley) as Charlie Corker
 It's in the Bag! (1945, United Artists - Starring Benchley) as Parker
 Duffy's Tavern (1945, Paramount - Starring Benchley as narrator in the film version of the show of the same name) as Robert Benchley
 Kiss and Tell (1945, Columbia - Starring Benchley) as Uncle George Archer
 Week-End at the Waldorf (1945, MGM - Starring Benchley) as Randy Morton
 Snafu (1945, Columbia - Starring Benchley) as Ben Stevens
 Road to Utopia (1945, Paramount - Benchley narrated) as narrator
 The Stork Club (1945, Paramount - Starring Benchley) as Tom P. Curtis
 The Bride Wore Boots (1946, Paramount - Starring Benchley) as Uncle Todd Warren
 Janie Gets Married (1946, Warner Bros. - Starring Benchley) as John Van Brunt (final film role)

Television
 Light's Diamond Jubilee (1954) TV special broadcast on all 4 TV networks, archive footage (from How to Raise a Baby)

Further reading

 Gordon Ernst, Robert Benchley: An Annotated Bibliography. (Greenwood Press, 1995).

Works cited
 Billy Altman, Laughter's Gentle Soul: The Life of Robert Benchley. (New York City: W. W. Norton, 1997. ).
 . URL accessed 6 May 2007.
 The Robert Benchley Society: The Annotated Bibliography of Robert Benchley Writings.  David Trumbull, URL accessed 20 May 2007.
 Norris W. Yates, Robert Benchley. (New York City, Twayne Publishers, 1968.).

References

External links
 
 

Lists of books
American literature-related lists